This is a list of frigates of the United States Navy, sorted by hull number. It includes all of the hull classification symbols FF and FFG. Prior to the 1975 ship reclassification, ships that are now classified as FF or FFG were classified as DE or DEG (destroyer escort). The  has been retired from active duty in the Navy as of 2015, and use has been replaced by the Littoral Combat Ship, to be augmented by the planned Constellation class guided-missile frigates.

For age-of-sail era frigates, see List of sailing frigates of the United States Navy. For PF (Patrol Frigate) ships, see List of patrol vessels of the United States Navy § Patrol frigate (PF).

Bronstein-class FF
The  comprised 2 ships, commissioned in 1963. They were both decommissioned in December 1990, and donated to Mexico in 1993.

Garcia-class FF
The  comprised 10 ships, commissioned from 1964 to 1968.

Knox-class FF
The  comprised 46 ships, commissioned between 1969 and 1974.

Glover-class AGFF
She was in commission from 1965 to 1990.

Brooke-class FFG
The  comprised 6 ships, commissioned from 1966 to 1968.

Oliver Hazard Perry-class FFG
The  comprised 51 ships, commissioned between 1977 and 1989.

Constellation-class FFG 
The Constellation class is planned to be 20 ships with 1 on order as of 2020

See also
 List of current ships of the United States Navy
 List of frigate classes
 List of frigate classes by country
 List of frigate classes of the Royal Navy

References

 NavSource Naval History Photographic History of The U.S. Navy: Destroyer Escorts, Frigates, Littoral Warfare Vessels
 http://www.navytimes.com/article/20130710/NEWS/307100033/7-frigates-on-list-of-FY-14-decommissionings

External links
Museum ships
 USS Ainsworth (FF-1090) - İnciraltı Sea Museum, İzmir, Turkey
 USS Truett (FF-1095) - Sattahip Naval Base, Sattahip District, Thailand

 
Frigates
Frigates list
United States Navy frigates